Leonine Holding GmbH, LLC, formerly Tele München Group, LLC (German: Tele München Gruppe; TMG), is a media company based in Munich.

The activities of Leonine include trade in licenses, investments in television and radio stations and distribution and production of television films and movies.

History

Tele München Group

The Tele München GmbH was founded on April 27, 1970, by author and producer Walter Ulbrich. It was purchased in 1977 by Herbert Kloiber and his business partner Fritz Buttenstedt. In 1980, the Concorde Filmverleih (Concorde film distribution) was founded and a year later, in 1981, the company acquired along with the cinema operator Hans-Joachim Flebbe several movie theaters in Hamburg, Berlin and Braunschweig.

TMG was partner at the television station Sat.1 in 1985; after a year, the company sold its shares and started the TV station musicbox. In the same year, TMG took over the Munich private radio station Radio Xanadu, which was later renamed to Radio Energy.

In 1987, Silvio Berlusconi’s company Fininvest acquired 50 percent of musicbox. This was the basis for the channel Tele 5. In 1988, Axel Springer Publishing House and CLT became partner at TMG. In 1989, 50 percent from the company  were sold to Capital Cities / ABC.

1991 TMG sold its shares in Tele 5 to the Axel Springer Publishing House and in 1992 founded, together with CLT, Bertelsmann, Bauer Media Group and The Walt Disney Company, the TV channel RTL II. In 1995, the television station Tm3 was founded by TMG and the Bauer Media Group.

In 1996, Herbert Kloiber bought back the TMG shares from Capital Cities / ABC, and took over the shares of Bauer Media Group on Tm3. In 1997, TMG participated in the Hungarian private broadcaster TV2.

In 1998, Rupert Murdoch's company News Corporation took over 66 percent of  Tm3 and two years later, in 2000, took over Tm3 completely.

On 28 April 2002, the channel Tele 5 was restarted by TMG. TMG launched a streaming service, Filmtastic, in 2017.

Leonine Holdings
In February 2019, Kohlberg Kravis Roberts (KKR) agreed to purchase TMG, with expected closing in April 2019. At closing, Fred Kogel's appointment as CEO would be effective. KKR also agreed to purchase the Universum Film movie distributor from RTL Group days later, with the intent to combine the two companies. i&u TV was acquired by April 2019, when the expanded TMG acquired Wiedemann & Berg. Wiedemann & Berg would continue its TV arm, W&B Television, as a joint venture with Endemol Shine Group. Founders Max Wiedemann and Quirin Berg would continue as managing directors of Wiedemann & Berg while adding the position of head of the group's feature film production division.

The enlarged Tele München Group was renamed Leonine Holdings in September 2019, with three main divisions: Distribution, Production, & Licensing. The distribution division, consisting of multiple Munich-based film distributors & a home video outlet, as well the company's stakes in RTL II & Tele 5, would be operating under the Leonine Distribution division name as of January 1, 2020. The production division, consisting of film & television production companies, would be grouped under the Leonine Production division, while continuing their separate identities. While under Leonine Distribution, RTL II, Tele 5, & the subscription video on demand services would continue under their current names. Leonine purchased Endemol Shine Group's share of Wiedemann & Berg Television.

Units 
 Leonine Licensing

Leonine Distribution 
 TM Distribution
 TM International
 Concorde (Munich) film company
 Concorde Home Entertainment (Munich)
 Universum Film movie distribution (former division of UFA GmbH subsidiary of RTL Group)

Broadcasting 
 RTL II (Munich, 31.5%)
Leonine Holding formerly owned Tele 5 channel, which, since September 2020, is a subsidiary of Warner Bros. Discovery.

Subscription video on demand channels
Filmtastic
Home of Horror
Arthouse CNM

Leonine Production 
 Clasart Film (Munich)
 Clasart Television
 Clasart Classic
 Odeon Film (85.23%)
 Odeon Fiction - fictional content for television, cinema and streaming platforms
 Odeon Entertainment - reality entertainment, documentaries, and live broadcasts
i&u TV (April 2019—)
Mediawan & Leonine Studios (joint venture with Mediawan)
Drama Republic (51%)
SEO Entertainment
Wiedemann & Berg Film (April 2019—) 
 W&B Television

Other interests 
 Load Studios - digital media 
 Storied Media Group, media project development and packaging

See also 
 ATV (Austria)
 Bauer Media Group
 Bertelsmann
 Tm3
 TV2

References

External links 

 Official website
 Leonine website (English)

Mass media companies of Germany
Mass media in Munich
Companies based in Munich
Film production companies of Germany
Mass media companies established in 1970
1970 establishments in West Germany
Kohlberg Kravis Roberts companies
2019 mergers and acquisitions
German companies established in 1970